H. H. Asquith (1852–1928) was Prime Minister of the United Kingdom from 1908 to 1916.

Asquith may also refer to:
Earl of Oxford and Asquith, a peerage title given to H. H. Asquith

People
 Persons of the Asquith family, descended from or related to Prime Minister Asquith:
Margot Asquith (1864–1945), author and second wife of the Prime Minister
Raymond Asquith (1878–1916), eldest son of the Prime Minister, died in World War I
Herbert Asquith (poet) (1881–1947), poet, the Prime Minister's second son
Arthur Asquith (1883–1939), brigadier-general, the Prime Minister's third son
Cynthia Asquith (1887–1960), author, the poet's wife
Violet Bonham Carter (1887–1969), politician and diarist, elder daughter of H.H. Asquith by his first wife
Cyril Asquith, Baron Asquith of Bishopstone (1890–1954), barrister, judge and law lord, fourth son of H.H. Asquith
Elizabeth Bibesco (1897–1945), writer, daughter of H.H. Asquith and Margot Asquith
Anthony Asquith (1902–1968), film director, youngest son of the Prime Minister
Julian Asquith, 2nd Earl of Oxford and Asquith (1916–2011), colonial administrator
Raymond Asquith, 3rd Earl of Oxford and Asquith (born 1952), former diplomat, elder son of the 2nd Earl
Clare Asquith, Countess of Oxford and Asquith (born 1951), independent scholar and author, wife of the 3rd Earl 
Dominic Asquith (born 1957), diplomat, ambassador to Iraq, Egypt and Libya, younger son of the 2nd Earl

Other
 Frederick Asquith (1870–1916), English cricketer
 Ros Asquith, British cartoonist, children's author, illustrator and journalist. 
 William Asquith, English rugby league player

Place names
Askwith, North Yorkshire, England, formerly spelled Asquith
Asquith, New South Wales, suburb of Sydney, Australia
Asquith Boys High School in Asquith, Sydney, Australia
Asquith Girls High School in Asquith, Sydney, Australia
Asquith, Saskatchewan, Canada
Asquith Bluff, Antarctica

Automobiles
Asquith (1901 automobile)
Asquith (1981 automobile)

English-language surnames